Lee Sang-Yong (born 9 January 1986) is a South Korean football player who is currently a free agent.

He has played for Chunnam Dragons in the K-League.

Club career statistics

References
 
 

1986 births
Living people
Association football defenders
South Korean footballers
Jeonnam Dragons players
K League 1 players
Footballers from Seoul